Cheryl Salem (née Prewitt) (born February 15, 1957) is an American Christian evangelist, author, musician, and former beauty pageant titleholder, who was Miss Mississippi 1979 and Miss America 1980. She was married to gospel singer Terry Blackwood in the late 1970s-early 1980s.

Early life
At age 11, a horrifying automobile accident left Prewitt with a scarred face, a body cast and was in a wheelchair.

Pageantry
Ms. Prewitt entered, and lost, pageants for five years before winning the crown that would take her to Atlantic City for the Miss America pageant. She won the Miss Starkville and Miss Mississippi titles in 1979.

Prewitt became Miss America 1980, despite a history of poverty, sexual abuse, a physical handicap, and a total of 200 facial stitches.

Personal life
She married Harry Salem II, (the brother-in-law of televangelist, Richard Roberts) in 1985. Along with her husband, she ministers through Salem Family Ministries.

The couple have two sons, Harry III and Roman, and had a daughter, Gabrielle, who died at age 6 in 1999 after being diagnosed with a brain tumor.

Bibliography

The Three Stages of Life: Passive Active Authoritative (2021)
Women of the Nation PRAY! (2018)
I Am a Worshiper Workbook (2017)
I Am a Worshiper (2016)
Tones of the Throne Room Workbook (2016)
Rebuilding the Ruins of Worship Workbook (2015)
We Who Worship Workbook (2015)
Rebuilding the Ruins of Worship Workbook (2015)
Tones of the Throne Room (2014)
Rebuilding the Ruins of Worship (2012)
We Who Worship (2009)
The Presence of Angels in Your Life (2011)
Don't Kill Each Other!  Let God Do It! (2010)*
Entering Rest - Be Still - a 40-Day Journey into the Presence of God (2009)
Obtaining Peace - A 40-Day Prayer Journal (2008)
2 Becoming 1 (2006)*
The Choice is Yours (2005)*
Overcoming Fear - A 40-Day Prayer Journal (2004)
Every Body Needs Balance (2004)
From Grief to Glory (2003)*
From Mourning to Morning (2001)*
Distractions from Destiny (2001)*
Speak the Word Over Your Family for Finances (2003)
Speak the Word Over Your Family for Healing (2003)
Speak the Word Over Your Family for Salvation (2003)
Fight in the Heavenlies
It's Too Soon to Give Up (1998)
An Angel's Touch (2000, 1997)
A Royal Child (1996)
The Mommy Book (1995)
How to Get a Balanced Body (1990)
Simple Facts:  Salvation, Healing and the Holy Ghost
Health and Beauty Secrets
Choose to be Happy
Abuse...Bruised but Not Broken (1989)
You Are Somebody (1988)
A Bright Shining Place - The Story of a Miracle (1981)

Items with * were written with Dr. Harry Salem II

Discography

  Enter In (2020)
  Communion (2020)
  Divine Romance Instrumental (2020)
  Divine Romance (2020)
  Teach Us How to Pray (2019)
  Righteous Revolution (2018)
  Reveal Yourself to Me (2018)
  Book of Ruth (2018)
  I AM Lullabies (2018)
  I Am a Worshiper (2017)
  Book of Proverbs (2016)
  Heaven on Earth (2012)
  The Holiest Place (2012)
  Prophetic Instrumental (2012)
  Revelation: Scriptures in Song (2012)
  Broken Places (2011)
  Great is Your Grace (2010)
  Deep Cries to Deep (2010)
  Awaken (2010)
  Lord, You're Holy (2008)
  Pour My Love On You (2005)
  The Glory is Here (2004)
  My Head is in Heaven (2002)
  Do I Trust You?''  (2001)

References

External links
Salem Family Ministries official web site

Miss America 1980s delegates
Miss America winners
Oral Roberts University people
Living people
1957 births
People from Ackerman, Mississippi
Miss America Preliminary Swimsuit winners
Miss Mississippi winners
20th-century American people
American evangelicals